Mozibur Rahman was an Indian politician and teacher. He was the inaugural holder of the Rajabala constituency at the Meghalaya Legislative Assembly.

Life
Rahman was born into a Bengali Muslim family in the village of Kasaripara in the Hallidayganj, Garo Hills of Meghalaya. Despite being an independent candidate, he defeated Khorsedur Rahman Khan of the Indian National Congress at the 1978 Meghalaya Legislative Assembly election, thus winning a seat at the Rajabala constituency of West Garo Hills district. He also participated in the 1983 Meghalaya Legislative Assembly election but was unsuccessful. Rahman also served as a teacher at the Samser Ali H.S. School.

References

Meghalaya politicians
Meghalaya MLAs 1978–1983
Year of birth missing
20th-century Bengalis
People from West Garo Hills district
20th-century Indian Muslims
Indian Sunni Muslims